Mansurovo (Mansur) is a rural locality (a village) and the administrative centre of Mansurovsky Selsoviet, Uchalinsky District, Bashkortostan, Russia. The population was 740 as of 2010. There are 21 streets.

Geography 
Mansurovo is located 26 km northeast of Uchaly (the district's administrative centre) by road. Ilyinka is the nearest rural locality.

References 

Rural localities in Uchalinsky District